is a dam and lake in Shiojiri, Nagano Prefecture, Japan, completed in 1953.

References 

Dams in Nagano Prefecture
Dams completed in 1953